Saint John Paul II was a pope of the Roman Catholic church during the late 20th century.

Saint John Paul II or variant, may also refer to:

Saint John Paul II National Shrine, in Washington D.C. USA
, a Maltese high-speed catamaran ferry built by Incat
 St John Paul II Catholic School (disambiguation)
 Saint John Paul II Academy, Boca Raton, Florida, USA

See also

 
 
 Karol Wojtyla (disambiguation)
 Pope John Paul II (disambiguation)
 John Paul II (disambiguation)
 John Paul (disambiguation)
 Saint John (disambiguation)
 Saint Paul (disambiguation)
 John II (disambiguation)
 Paul II (disambiguation)